Chak Amru is a town of Shakargarh tehsil in Narowal district of Punjab province of the Pakistan.   It is located near Pakistan-India border.

Chak Amru town has a railway Station called Chak Amru railway station.

References

External links 

Narowal District